Durban Iconic Tower, is a proposed multi-billion Rand skyscraper in Durban, KwaZulu-Natal, South Africa. 

At , if built it would be the tallest building in Africa and the Southern Hemisphere, exceeding the height of the Jemma Al Djazair, which will be 265m when complete. It would replace The Leonardo, which is the tallest in South Africa at 234m. It would also be the tallest structure in South Africa, exceeding the height of the Sasol CTL chimney in Secunda, which is 301m. If built as planned, it will be the 73rd tallest building in the world. 

The building was proposed in 2016, and construction was planned to start in 2018 pending approval, but the tendering process has since been rejected by the Bid Adjudication Committee and thus the project is uncertain.

References 

Proposed skyscrapers
Proposed buildings and structures in South Africa
Skyscrapers in South Africa